The 2019 2. divisjon (referred to as PostNord-ligaen for sponsorship reasons) was a Norwegian football third-tier league season. The league consisted of 28 teams divided into 2 groups of 14 teams.

The league was played as a double round-robin tournament, where all teams played 26 matches. The season began on 13 April and concluded on 26 October.

Team changes
The following teams changed division since the 2018 season.

To 2. divisjon
Promoted from 3. divisjon
 Oppsal
 Kvik Halden
 Sola
 Sotra
 Byåsen
 Senja

Relegated from 1. divisjon
 Åsane
 Florø
 Levanger

From 2. divisjon
Promoted to 1. divisjon
 Raufoss
 Skeid
 KFUM Oslo

Relegated to 3. divisjon
 Nybergsund
 Hønefoss 
 Stabæk 2
 Fløy
 Vålerenga 2
 Vard Haugesund

League tables

Group 1

Group 2

Promotion play-offs

The teams who finished in second place in their respective group qualified for the promotion play-offs, where they faced each other over two legs. The winner, Åsane, then played against the 14th placed team in 1. divisjon for a place in the 2020 1. divisjon.

Åsane won 4–1 on aggregate.

Top scorers

Group 1

Group 2

References

Norwegian Second Division seasons
3
Norway
Norway